Berhane Abrehe (Tigrinya: በርሃነ አብረሀ) is an Eritrean top government official who, served as the country's Minister of Finance of Eritrea from 2001 to 2014.

He was born in 1945. In 1972, Berhane Abrehe graduated with a Master of Science in Civil Engineering from the University of Illinois at Urbana-Champaign. He has held the post of Director of Macro-Economic policy in the office of the President of Eritrea, subsequently advancing to his Cabinet position and becoming the third Minister of Finance in the 14 years since Eritrea's proclamation of independence in May 1993. His status was described as unclear in a 2007 leaked US cable.

In September 2018 Berhane Abrehe published a controversial book: ”Eritrea Hagerey [Eritrea My Country]. A quote on the cover of one of the books reads, “...in a renewed courage, [Berhane Abrehe] has presented a plan, in a civilized Eritrean manner, on how to end dictatorship [in Eritrea] and how to prevent it from reappearing again”.

After the publishing of his book, Berhane Abrehe was subsequently arrested. His whereabouts are unknown, and concerns for his well being has been high in the Eritrean opposition, as he is a 77 year old who is in poor health and underwent a liver transplant not long before his detainment. His son, Efrem Berhane Abrehe, is an Eritrean activist working hard to fight for his fathers freedom. Videos of him talking about his father can be found on Eritrean opposition YouTube channel, Erisat.

External links
 Image of Berhane Abrehe

References

Eritrean economists
Grainger College of Engineering alumni
1945 births
Living people
Place of birth missing (living people)
People's Front for Democracy and Justice politicians
Finance ministers of Eritrea
Government ministers of Eritrea